Bogdan Andrei Șandru (born 4 July 1989) is a Romanian professional footballer who plays as a defender for Liga III side CS Tunari.

Honours
Tricolorul Breaza
Liga III: 2008–09

Unirea Câmpina
Liga IV – Prahova County: 2011–12

Fortuna Poiana Câmpina
Liga III: 2013–14

Dunărea Călărași
Liga II: 2017–18

Chindia Târgoviște
Liga II: 2018–19

References

External links
 
 

1989 births
Living people
Romanian footballers
Association football defenders
Liga I players
Liga II players
Liga III players
FC Politehnica Iași (2010) players
CS Pandurii Târgu Jiu players
FC Universitatea Cluj players
FC Dunărea Călărași players
AFC Chindia Târgoviște players